Ladyville is the largest village in the country of Belize, eight miles northwest of Belize City in the Belize District. The Philip Goldson Highway connects Ladyville to Belize City.

History
Although originally a separate settlement, Ladyville has become a suburb of Belize City, with many of its residents commuting to the city on a daily basis.

Demographics
Ladyville recorded a population of 5,458 in the 2010 national census. The total number of households are 1,227 with an average size of 3.6 persons.

Geography
Ladyville is located on the north bank of the Belize River and is approximately 5 miles inland from the Caribbean Sea. The terrain is part of the Belize's lowland and part of a natural flood plain. The land consists of broadleaf lowland forests and marshlands with creeks, ponds and mangrove forest along the coast. The Phillip Goldson highway cuts through the village. It has several neighbourhoods:
Vista Del Mar
New/Old Site
"Mitchelle Estate"
Perez Estate
Japan
Lake Gardens
Bainton's Bank Area
"Los Lagos Community"
"Lord's Bank"

Politics
National Government
Ladyville is part of the Belize Rural Central Constituency. Currently, the area representative for the Belize Rural Central Constituency, following the general elections on 5 November 2015, is Beverly Diane Castillo with 2560 votes who defeated incumbent representative Dolores Balderamos Garcia who had 2502 votes.

2015 National Election Summary
Belize Rural Central
7513
5284
70.33%
Beverly Diane Castillo
UDP
2560
48.45%
Dolores Balderamos Garcia
PUP
2502
47.35%
Javier Molina
BPP
152
2.88%
rejected
70
1.32%

Local Government
The Village Council is currently headed by Chairlady Dian Wite.
2016–2019 Village Council members

List of political parties in Belize

Public utilities
The Belize Telemedia Limited - Ladyville Branch is located on the Old Airport Road.
The Belize Electricity Limited - Ladyville Branch, is located at 9 3/4mls Northern Highway.
The Belize Water Services Ltd - Ladyville branch is located at Lord's Bank road.
Butane Gas services are provided by Southern Choice Butane and Belize Western Energy Limited.

Educational institutes

Primary schools
Our Lady of The Way R.C. School
Ladyville Evangelical School
Seven Day Adventist Primary School.

High schools
Ladyville Technical High School
Tubal Trade Institute

Medical
St.Christopher's Clinic - Chemist/Pharmacy/General Practitioner
Batsub/Price Barracks - Army Medics
Ladyville Pharmacy - Chemist/Pharmacy
Ladyville Seven Day Adventist Community Clinic

Transportation

Philip S. W. Goldson International Airport, formerly known as The Belize International Airport (BZE), is located in Ladyville and is operated by the Belize Airport Concession Company Ltd. The airport serves Belize City and is the nation of Belize's main airport. It has a runway length of 7100 ft and is currently served by 9 airlines. Transportation from the airport to the Philip Goldson Highway is only available by the Ladyville Airport Taxi union. Public transportation for Ladyville is serviced by several different bus companies that operate both locally and nationally.

Attractions

Headquarters of the Belize Brewing Company, brewers of Belikin beer and Lighthouse lager.
Coca-Cola bottling plant
Belize Defense Force along with BATSUB (British Army Support Unit Belize) headquarters at Price Barracks.
NAVCO National Association of Village Councils The Belize district office is located at the Ladyville Community Center on Poinsettia and Seagull Streets, Ladyville.

References

External links

 Manatee Lookout
 Belize River Lodge
 Phillip Goldson Int'l Airport
 Belize Defence Force
 National Association of Village Councils

Populated places in Belize District
Belize Rural Central